In abstract algebra, the total algebra of a monoid is a generalization of the monoid ring that allows for infinite sums of elements of a ring.
Let R be a ring.  Then the total algebra of S over R is the set  of all functions  with the addition law given by the (pointwise) operation:

and with the multiplication law given by:

The sum on the right-hand side has finite support, and so is well-defined in R.

These operations turn  into a ring.  There is an embedding of R into , given by the constant functions, which turns  into an R-algebra.

An example is the ring of formal power series, where the monoid S is the natural numbers.  The product is then the Cauchy product.

References
 : §III.2

Abstract algebra